Coleophora stachydis is a moth of the family Coleophoridae that is endemic to Afghanistan.

The larvae feed on Stachys parviflora. They feed on the leaves of their host plant.

References

External links

stachydis
Moths of Asia
Endemic fauna of Afghanistan
Moths described in 1994